The Battle of the Frontiers comprised battles fought along the eastern frontier of France and in southern Belgium, shortly after the outbreak of the First World War. The battles resolved the military strategies of the French Chief of Staff General Joseph Joffre with Plan XVII and an offensive adaptation of the German  deployment plan by Helmuth von Moltke the Younger. The German concentration on the right (northern) flank, was to wheel through Belgium and attack the French in the rear.

The German advance was delayed by the movement of the French Fifth Army (General Charles Lanrezac) towards the north-west to intercept them and the presence of the British Expeditionary Force (BEF) on the French left. The Franco-British troops were driven back by the Germans, who were able to invade northern France. French and British rearguard actions delayed the Germans, allowing the French time to transfer forces on the eastern frontier to the west to defend Paris, culminating in the First Battle of the Marne.

Background

Belgian plans

Belgian military planning assumed that other powers would assist the Belgian Army to eject an invader and a formal alliance between France and Britain was not solidified by a potential German invasion, despite the Anglo-French Entente (1904). The Belgians judged that the British attitude towards their country had changed and that Belgium had come to be seen as a British protectorate. Moranville began planning for the concentration of the army and met Belgian railway officials on 29 July.

The Belgian army was to be massed in central Belgium, in front of the National redoubt of Belgium, ready to face any border, while the Fortified Position of Liège and Fortified Position of Namur were left to secure the frontiers. On mobilisation, the King became Commander-in-Chief and chose where the army was to concentrate. Amid the disruption of the new rearmament plan, disorganised and poorly trained Belgian soldiers would benefit from a central position to delay contact with an invader but it would also need fortifications for defence, which were on the frontier. A school of thought wanted a return to a frontier deployment, in line with French theories of the offensive. Belgian plans became a compromise, in which the field army concentrated behind the Gete river, with two divisions further forward at Liège and Namur.

Schlieffen–Moltke Plan

Alfred von Schlieffen, Chief of the Imperial German General Staff (Oberste Heeresleitung, OHL) from  devised plans for a decisive battle against the French army in Germany, Belgium or France.  was a contingency plan for a Franco-German war, in which France (due to fewer numbers) would be on the defensive and Germany would attack by invading Belgium between Antwerp and Namur to advance south and breach the Verdun–Marne–Paris defensive area. The German armies would then pause until railways could be repaired and supplies accumulated for a second offensive operation.

The main German force tried to follow  to envelop the French armies on the left (north) and press them back over the Meuse, Aisne, Somme, Oise, Marne and Seine rivers, unable to withdraw into central France. Moltke hoped that the French would either be annihilated or the manoeuvre from the north would create conditions for victory in the centre or in Lorraine, on the common border.

Plan XVII

The armies were to concentrate opposite the German frontier around Épinal, Nancy and Verdun–Mezières, with an army in reserve around Ste Menehould and Commercy. Since 1871, railway building had given the French General Staff sixteen lines to the German frontier against thirteen available to the German army; the French could wait until German intentions were clear. The French deployment was intended to be ready for a German offensive in Lorraine or through Belgium. It was anticipated that the Germans would use reserve troops but also that a large German army would be mobilised on the border with Russia, leaving the western army with sufficient troops only to advance through Belgium south of the Meuse and the Sambre rivers. French intelligence had obtained a map exercise of the German general staff of 1905, in which German troops had gone no further north than Namur and assumed that plans to besiege Belgian forts were a defensive measure against the Belgian army.

A German attack from south-eastern Belgium towards Mézières and a possible offensive from Lorraine towards Verdun, Nancy and St Dié was anticipated. The plan was an evolution of Plan XVI and made more provision for the possibility of a German offensive through Belgium. The First, Second and Third armies were to concentrate between Épinal and Verdun opposite Alsace and Lorraine, the Fifth Army was to assemble from Montmédy to Sedan and Mézières. The Fourth Army was to be held back, west of Verdun, ready to move east to attack the southern flank of a German invasion through Belgium or southwards against the northern flank of an attack through Lorraine. No formal provision was made for combined operations with the British Expeditionary Force (BEF) but joint arrangements had been made and in 1911, during the Second Moroccan Crisis, the French had been told that six divisions could be expected to operate around Maubeuge.

Declarations of war
At midnight on  the German government sent an ultimatum to Russia and announced a state of  during the day; the Ottoman government ordered mobilisation and the London Stock Exchange closed. On 1 August, the British government ordered the mobilisation of the navy, the German government ordered general mobilisation and declared war on Russia. Hostilities commenced on the Polish frontier; the French government ordered general mobilisation and next day the German government sent an ultimatum to Belgium demanding free passage, as German troops crossed the frontier of Luxembourg. Military operations began on the French frontier, Libau was bombarded by a German light cruiser  and the British government guaranteed naval protection for French coasts. On 3 August, the Belgian Government refused German demands and the British Government promised military support to Belgium should Germany invade. Germany declared war on France, the British government ordered general mobilisation and Italy declared neutrality. On 4 August, the British government sent an ultimatum to Germany and declared war at midnight on  Central European Time. Belgium severed diplomatic relations with Germany and Germany declared war on Belgium. German troops crossed the Belgian frontier and attacked Liège.

Prelude

French preparations
Joseph Joffre, who had been Commander-in-Chief of the French army since 1911 and the Minister of War, Adolphe Messimy met on 1 August, to agree that the military conduct of the war should exclusively be the responsibility of the Commander-in-Chief. On 2 August, as small parties of German soldiers crossed the French border, Messimy told Joffre that he had the freedom to order French troops across the German but not the Belgian frontier. Joffre sent warning orders to the covering forces near the frontier, requiring the VII Corps to prepare to advance towards Mühlhausen (Mulhouse) to the north-east of Belfort and XX Corps to make ready to begin an offensive towards Nancy. As soon as news arrived that German troops had entered Luxembourg, the Fourth Army was ordered to move between the Third and Fifth armies, ready to attack to the north of Verdun. Operations into Belgium were forbidden, to deny the Germans a pretext until 4 August, when it was certain that German troops had already violated the Belgian border. To comply with the Franco-Russian Alliance, Joffre ordered an invasion of Alsace-Lorraine for 14 August, although anticipating a German offensive through Belgium.

On 8 August, General Instruction No. 1 had ordered the Fifth Army to take a position on the left of the Fourth Army, ready to attack the southern flank of German force advancing from Mézières and Mouzon, through the difficult terrain in between. On 14 August Joffre and Lanrezac met but Joffre considered that only a few German cavalry and infantry parties had crossed the Meuse. With the BEF moving to Maubeuge and Hirson a redeployment of the Fifth Army would disrupt the deployment of the other armies. On 14 August a new intelligence report showed eight German corps between Luxembourg and Liège and by the next day Joffre allowed the move of the Fifth Army north, to operate beyond the Meuse. The XI Corps was transferred to the Fourth Army and the XVIII Corps was moved from the Third Army to the Fifth Army, which was made responsible for the defence of Maubeuge.

Joffre began to dismiss commanders in early August, beginning with the VII Corps commander Bonneau and by 6 September had removed two army, ten corps and  commanders, by transferring them to Limoges. The VII Corps in the south was reinforced by two divisions, a cavalry division and the First Group of Reserve Divisions. The corps was renamed the Army of Alsace, to relieve the First Army of concern about Alsace during the operations in Lorraine. Two corps were removed from the Second Army and became a strategic reserve. Joffre met Sir John French on 16 August and learned that the British could be ready by 24 August, Joffre also arranged for Territorial divisions to cover the area from Maubeuge to Dunkirk. The German siege of the Liège forts ended on 16 August and the 1st and 2nd armies with twelve corps and the 3rd Army with four corps began to advance behind cavalry screens. On 18 August, Joffre ordered the Fifth Army to prepare for a German offensive on both banks of the Meuse or to meet a small force on the north bank.

French plan
On 5 August, Joffre ordered an offensive by the VII Corps, on the right flank of the First Army, to begin on 7 August towards Mulhouse. The capture of the 2nd Army order of battle on 7 August, convinced Joffre that the strength of the German forces on the flanks had left the centre weak and vulnerable to an offensive towards Neufchâteau and Arlon. On 8 August, Joffre issued General Instruction No. 1, containing his strategic intent, which was to destroy the German army rather than capture ground. The offensive into Alsace and that by the First and Second armies into Lorraine, would pin down German forces and attract reinforcements, as the main offensive further north drove in the German centre and outflanked the German forces in Belgium from the south. Joffre expected that the attack into the German centre would meet little resistance. The First and Second armies would advance south of the German fortified area from Metz–Thionville, with the Fourth Reserve Group guarding the northern flank near Hirson, to watch the Chimay Gap and deflect a German attack from the north or east. The strategy assumed that the main German force would be deployed around Luxembourg and from Metz–Thionville, with smaller forces in Belgium. On 9 August, an intelligence report had one German active corps near Freiburg close to the Swiss border, three near Strasbourg, four in Luxembourg to the north of Thionville and six from Liège in Belgium, towards the north end of Luxembourg, which left five corps un-located. The French general staff inferred that they were between Metz-Thionville and Luxembourg, ready to advance towards Sedan or Mézières.

Joffre set 14 August as the date when the First and Second armies were to invade Lorraine between Toul and Épinal, south of the German fortified area of Metz-Thionville. Passes in the Vosges to the south of Donon were to be captured before the main advance began. The advances of the First and Second armies were to attract German forces towards the south, while a French manoeuvre took place in Belgium and Luxembourg, to pierce a weak point in the German deployment and then destroy the main German armies.

News that German forces were attacking towards the Meuse bridges south of Namur, led Joffre to expect a German attack from Mézières to Givet,  further north, intended to envelop the French northern flank and another force to try to cross the Meuse from Montmédy to Sedan. On 12 August, Joffre allowed Lanrezac to move the I Corps west to Dinant on the Meuse and on 15 August, Joffre ordered the bulk of the Fifth Army to move north-west behind the Sambre. No large German force was expected to cross to the north of the Meuse, which made the French general staff certain that the German centre was weaker than expected. On 18 August, Joffre directed the Third, Fourth and Fifth armies, together with the Belgians and British, to attack the German armies around Thionville and Luxembourg, where  corps were thought to have assembled. The Third and Fourth armies were to defeat German forces between Thionville and Bastogne, as they attacked westwards towards Montmédy and Sedan. The Fifth Army was to intercept German forces advancing towards Givet and then the Fourth Army was to swing north and attack the southern flank of the German armies. The Third and Fourth armies would defeat decisively the main German armies in the west and for this, two more corps were added to the four in the Fourth Army, taken from the flanking armies.

Alsace

Battle of Mulhouse, 7–10 August

The first French offensive of the war, known as the Battle of Mulhouse, began on 7 August. Joffre had directed the First and Second armies to engage as many German divisions as possible to assist French forces operating further north. The French VII Corps with the 14th and 41st divisions, under the command of General Bonneau, advanced from Belfort to Mulhouse and Colmar  to the north-east. On 8 August, Bonneau cautiously continued the advance and occupied Mulhouse, shortly after its German garrison had left the town. The First Army commander General Auguste Dubail preferred to dig in and complete the army mobilisation but Joffre ordered the advance to continue. With the arrival of two corps of the German 7th Army from Strasbourg, the Germans mounted a counter-attack on the morning of 9 August, at nearby Cernay. Mulhouse was recaptured on 10 August and Bonneau withdrew towards Belfort to escape a German encirclement.

VII Corps was reinforced with the 44th Division, the 55th Reserve Division, the 8th Cavalry Division and the 1st Group of Reserve Divisions (58th, 63rd and 66th Reserve divisions) to re-invade Alsace on 14 August, as part of the bigger offensive by the First and Second armies into Lorraine, which drew most of the German 7th Army northwards. The Army of Alsace began a new offensive against four Landwehr brigades, the VII Corps advancing from Belfort with two divisions on the right passing through Dannemarie, at the head of the valley of the Ill. On the left flank, two divisions advanced in co-operation with Chasseur battalions, which had moved into the Fecht valley on 12 August. On the evening of 14 August, Thann was captured and the most advanced troops had passed beyond the suburbs of Thann, Cernay and Dannemarie on the western outskirts of the city by 16 August. On 18 August, the VII Corps attacked Mulhouse and captured Altkirch on the south-eastern flank as the northern flank advanced towards Colmar and Neuf-Breisach.

The German defenders were forced back from high ground to the west of Mulhouse on both banks of the Doller and into the Mulhouse suburbs, where a house-to-house battle took place. The streets and houses of Dornach were captured systematically and by the evening of 19 August the French had recaptured the city. After being overrun, the Germans withdrew hastily through the Hardt forest to avoid being cut off and crossed the Rhine pursued by the French, retreating to Ensisheim,  to the north. The French captured   and considerable amounts of equipment. With the capture of the Rhine bridges and valleys leading into the plain, the Army of Alsace had gained control of upper-Alsace. The French consolidated the captured ground and prepared to continue the offensive but on 23 August preparations were suspended, as news arrived of the defeats in Lorraine and Belgium; instead the French withdrew and consolidated the ridge beyond the Fortified region of Belfort. On 26 August the French withdrew from Mulhouse to a more defensible line near Altkirch, to provide reinforcements for the French armies closer to Paris. The Army of Alsace was disbanded and the VII Corps was transferred to the Somme. The 8th Cavalry Division was attached to the First Army and two more divisions were sent later.

Belgium

Battle of Haelen, 12 August

The Battle of Haelen (Halen in Dutch) was a cavalry battle at the beginning of the First World War. Haelen was a small market town along the principal axis of advance of the German imperial army and provided a good crossing point over the River Gete. The battle took place on 12 August between German forces, led by Georg von der Marwitz and the Belgian troops commanded by Léon de Witte. Belgian engineers had blown the bridge over the Gete but the structure only partly collapsed and the Germans got  troops over it into the centre of Haelen. The main Belgian defence line was west of Haelen in terrain which gave only an obstructed view to the attacker. The  were also repulsed despite support from the 2nd Guards Machine-gun Detachment and dismounted cavalry sharpshooters.

Towards the end of the day Marwitz broke off the engagement; the 2nd Cavalry Division retired towards Hasselt and the 4th Cavalry Division withdrew to Alken. De Witte had repulsed the German cavalry attacks by ordering the cavalry, which included a company of cyclists and one of pioneers to fight  dismounted and meet the attack with massed rifle fire, which inflicted significant casualties upon the Germans. The German cavalry had managed to obscure the operations on the German right flank and established a front parallel with Liège and discovered the positions of the Belgian field army but had not been able to penetrate beyond the Belgian front line and discover Belgian dispositions beyond. Although a Belgian victory, the battle had little strategic effect: the German armies besieged and captured the fortified regions of Namur, Liège and Antwerp, on which Belgian strategy depended.

Lorraine

Battle of Lorraine, 14–25 August

The main French offensive in the south began on 14 August when the First Army advanced with two corps into the Vosges and two corps north-east towards Sarrebourg and the two right-hand corps of the Second Army of General de Castelnau advanced on the left of the First Army. One corps and the Second Group of Reserve Divisions advanced slowly towards Morhange in echelon, as a flank guard against a German attack from Metz. The First Army had captured several passes further south since 8 August, to protect the southern flank as the army advanced to Donon and Sarrebourg. Despite warnings from Joffre against divergence, the army was required to advance towards the Vosges passes to the south-east, eastwards towards Donon and north-east towards Sarrebourg. At dusk, the 26th Division of the XIII Corps attacked Cirey but was repulsed by massed artillery and machine-gun fire and suffered a costly repulse. On 15 August, the Second Army reported that German long-range artillery had been able to bombard the French artillery and infantry undisturbed and that dug-in German infantry had inflicted many casualties on the French as they attacked.

The Second Army had to attack methodically after artillery preparation but managed to push back the German defenders. Intelligence reports identified a main line of resistance of the German 6th Army and 7th Army, which had been combined under the command of Crown Prince Rupprecht of Bavaria, close to the advanced French troops and that a counter-offensive was imminent. On 16 August, the Germans opposed the advance with long-range artillery fire and on 17 August, the First Army reinforced the advance on Sarrebourg. When the Germans were found to have left the city Joffre ordered the Second Army to incline further to the north, which had the effect of increasing the divergence of the French armies. A German counter-attack on 20 August forced separate battles on the French armies, which were defeated and forced to retreat in disorder. The German pursuit was slow and Castelnau was able to occupy positions east of Nancy and extend the right wing towards the south, to regain touch with the First Army. During 22 August, the right flank was attacked and driven back  from the position where the offensive had begun on 14 August. The First Army withdrew but managed to maintain contact with the Second Army and on 24 August, both armies began a counter-offensive at the  Battle of the Trouée de Charmes and regained the line of 14 August, by early September.

Ardennes

Battle of the Ardennes, 21–23 August

On 19 August, the Fourth army of General Fernand de Langle de Cary, was ordered to occupy the bridges over the Semois but not to advance into Belgium until the German offensive began. A premature attack would advance into a trap, rather than give time for the Germans to empty Luxembourg of troops before the French advanced. On 20 August the German armies in the south attacked the French first and Second armies and next day the Third and Fourth armies began their offensive. The Fourth Army crossed the Semois and advanced towards Neufchâteau and the Third Army of General Pierre Ruffey attacked towards Arlon, as a right flank guard for the Fourth army.

South of Verdun, the Third Army was renamed Army of Lorraine and was to watch for a German offensive from Metz, which left the remainder of the Third Army free to concentrate on the offensive into Belgium. The French armies invaded Belgium with nine infantry corps but ten German corps and six reserve brigades of the 4th and 5th armies lay between Metz and the north of Luxembourg. The German 4th Army under Albrecht, Duke of Württemberg and 5th Army of Crown Prince Wilhelm had moved slower than the 1st, 2nd and 3rd armies and the French offensive towards them was reported on 21 August. The French armies had few maps and were unaware of the size of the German force opposite, as the Third Army brushed aside small German detachments.

As the fog lifted, German artillery caught the French guns in the open and silenced them. A German counter-attack routed a French division and the corps was not rallied until the evening. To the north the IV Corps also advanced in fog and encountered German troops dug in near Virton and was forced back also with a division routed. On the southern flank, the VI Corps was pushed back a short distance. In the Fourth Army area, the II Corps on the right flank managed to keep level with the Third Army to the south but was not able to advance further. Further north, XII Corps advanced steadily but the XVII Corps beyond was outflanked and the 33rd Division lost most of its artillery. On the northern flank the XI and IX corps were not seriously engaged.

The French commanders were ordered by Joffre to continue the offensive on 23 August, as early as possible since his strategy depended on the success of the Third and Fourth armies. In the Fourth Army area, the 33rd Division of XVII Corps had been routed and the rest of the corps had withdrawn during the night of  The 5th Colonial Brigade withdrew from Neufchâteau before dawn on 23 August, exposing the right flank of XII Corps, which also fell back. By the end of 23 August the survivors of the Third and Fourth armies were back to their jumping-off positions except for the XI and IX corps on the northern flank.

Sambre

Battle of Charleroi, 21–23 August

Opposite the French were the 2nd and 3rd armies, with  against the  divisions. The I Corps held the west bank of the Meuse from Givet to Namur, X Corps faced north-west along the Sambre, with the III Corps to the west opposite Charleroi and the XVIII Corps further to the left. French cavalry on the left flank skirmished with German cavalry on 20 August and next day Joffre ordered the Fifth Army to advance, with the BEF on the left to find and attack the German forces west of the Meuse.

Before the French could cross the Sambre a German attack began between Namur and Charleroi and captured the Sambre bridges. On 22 August the French attacked to retake them but were repulsed in the centre. The I Corps was ordered to move north to Namur, which left  of the Meuse defended by one reserve division and the 3rd Army was able to cross north of Givet. The I Corps drove part of the 3rd Army back across the river on 23 August but was not able to recapture Dinant. At the same time the BEF was attacked by the 1st Army at Mons. With the evacuation of Namur and news of the French Fourth Army retreating from the Ardennes, Lanrezac ordered a withdrawal around midnight towards Givet, which was the final French manoeuvre of the Battle of the Frontiers.

Battle of Mons, 23 August

On 23 August, The German IX Corps advanced and part of the 35th Brigade got across the Mons–Condé Canal east of Nimy; reached the railway beyond in the early afternoon but was repulsed from the town. Mons was occupied unopposed but on higher ground to the east, the defence continued. The 17th Division advanced to the road from St Symphorien to St Ghislain. At  the divisional commander ordered an enveloping attack on the British east of Mons, who were pushed back after a stand on the Mons-Givry road. By  reports to Kluck revealed that the British were in St Ghislain and at the canal crossings to the west as far as the bridge at Pommeroeuil, with no troops east of Condé. With reports indicating that the right flank was clear of Allied troops, Kluck ordered the III Corps to advance through St Ghislain and Jemappes on the right of IX Corps and the IV Corps to continue towards Hensis and Thulies; the IV Corps was already attacking at the Canal du Centre and the II Corps and the IV Reserve Corps were following on behind the main part of the army.

Kluck ordered the attack to continue on 24 August, past the west of Maubeuge and that II Corps was to catch up behind the right flank of the army. IX Corps was to advance to the east of Bavai, III Corps was to advance to the west of the village, IV Corps was to advance towards Warnies-le-Grand  further to the west and the II Cavalry Corps was to head towards Denain to cut off the British retreat. At dawn the IX Corps resumed its advance and pushed forwards against rearguards until the afternoon when the corps stopped the advance due to uncertainty about the situation on its left flank and the proximity of Maubeuge. At  cavalry reports led Quast to resume the advance, which was slowed by the obstacles of Maubeuge and III Corps. The staff at Kluck's headquarters, claimed that the two day's fighting had failed to envelop the British due to the subordination of the army to Bülow and the 2nd Army headquarters, which had insisted that the 1st Army keep closer to the western flank, rather than attack to the west of Mons. It was believed that only part of the BEF had been engaged and that there was a main line of defence from Valenciennes to Bavai and Kluck ordered it to be enveloped on 25 August.

Aftermath

Analysis

The French offensive was defeated in a few days; on the right the First and Second armies advanced on 14 August and were back at their jumping-off points on 20 August. Joffre's strategy had failed due to an underestimation of the German armies and the dispersion of the French offensive effort. With a large German force operating in Belgium, the German centre had appeared to be vulnerable to the Third and Fourth armies. The mistaken impression of the size of the German force in Belgium or its approach route was not as significant as the faulty information about the strength of the German armies opposite the Third and Fourth armies. Joffre blamed others and claimed that the French infantry had failed to show offensive qualities, despite outnumbering the German armies at their most vulnerable point, a claim that Robert A. Doughty in 2005 called "pure balderdash".

The reality was that many of the French casualties were said to have come from an excess of offensive spirit and on 23 August, Ruffey concluded that the infantry had attacked without artillery preparation or support during the attack. Early on 24 August, Joffre ordered a withdrawal to a line from Verdun to Mézières and Maubeuge and began to transfer troops from the east opposite the German border, to the western flank. The French armies were to destroy railway facilities and inflict as many casualties as possible on the German armies, preparatory to resuming the offensive. Two strategic alternatives were possible, to attack the eastern flank of the 1st Army or to envelop the western flank of all the German armies. On 25 August, Joffre issued General Instruction No. 2, for a withdrawal to a line from Verdun to Reims and Amiens and the assembly of two corps and four reserve divisions near Amiens, for the envelopment operation. Joffre called for much greater integration of the infantry and artillery and for more tactical dispersal of infantry to nullify German fire power.

Casualties
In 2009, Herwig recorded that the casualties in the 6th Army in August were   killed and  September with  killed.

Subsequent operations

Great Retreat, 24 August – 5 September

The BEF fought the Battle of Mons on 24 August, by when the French First and Second armies had been pushed back by attacks of the German 7th and 6th armies between St Dié and Nancy, the Third Army held positions east of Verdun against attacks by the 5th Army, the Fourth Army held positions from the junction with the Third Army south of Montmédy, westwards to Sedan, Mezières and Fumay, facing the 4th Army and the Fifth Army was between Fumay and Maubeuge, with the 3rd Army advancing up the Meuse valley from Dinant and Givet into a gap between the Fourth and Fifth armies and the 2nd Army pressed forward into the angle between the Meuse and Sambre directly against the Fifth Army. On the far west flank of the French, the BEF prolonged the line from Maubeuge to Valenciennes against the 1st Army and Army Detachment von Beseler masked the Belgian army at Antwerp.

On 26 August, German forces captured Valenciennes and began the Siege of Maubeuge  Leuven (Louvain) was sacked by German troops and the Battle of Le Cateau was fought by the BEF and the 1st Army. Longwy was surrendered by its garrison and next day British Marines and a party of the Royal Naval Air Service (RNAS) landed at Ostend; Lille and Mezières were occupied by German troops. Arras was occupied on 27 August and a French counter-offensive began at the Battle of St Quentin (1914) (Battle of Guise  On 29 August the Fifth Army counter-attacked the 2nd Army south of the Oise, from Vervins to Mont Dorigny and west of the river from Mont Dorigny to Moy towards St Quentin on the Somme, while the British held the line of the Oise west of La Fère. Laon, La Fère, and Roye were captured by German troops on 30 August and Amiens the next day. On 1 September Craonne and Soissons were captured and on 5 September the BEF ended its retreat from Mons, German troops reached Claye,  from Paris, Reims was captured, German forces withdrew from Lille and the First Battle of the Marne (Battle of the Ourcq)  began, marking the end of the Great Retreat of the western flank of the Franco-British armies.

By 4 September the First and Second armies had slowed the advance of the 7th and 6th armies west of St Dié and east of Nancy, from where the Second Army had withdrawn its left flank, to face north between Nancy and Toul. A gap between the left of the Second Army and the right of the Third Army at Verdun, which faced north-west, on a line towards Revigny against the 5th Army advance, west of the Meuse between Varennes and St Ménéhould. The Fourth Army had withdrawn to Sermaize, west to the Marne at Vitry le François and then across the river to Sompons, against the 4th Army, which had advanced from Rethel, to Suippes and the west of Chalons. The new Ninth Army held a line from Mailly against the 3rd Army, which had advanced from Mézières, over the Vesle and the Marne west of Chalons. The 2nd Army had advanced from Marle on the Serre, across the Aisne and the Vesle, between Reims and Fismes to Montmort, north of the junction of the Ninth and Fifth armies at Sezanne. The Fifth Army and the BEF had withdrawn south of the Oise, Serre, Aisne and Ourq, pursued by the 2nd Army on a line from Guise to Laon, Vailly and Dormans and by the 1st Army from Montdidier, towards Compiègne and then south-east towards Montmirail. The new French Sixth Army, linked with the left of the BEF, west of the Marne at Meaux, to Pontiose north of Paris. French garrisons were besieged at Strasbourg, Metz, Thionville, Longwy, Montmédy and Maubeuge. The Belgian army was invested at Antwerp in the National redoubt and at fortress troops continued the defence of the Liège forts.

Battle of Grand Couronné, 4–13 September

The German offensive began during the night of 3 September against the fortifications of the Grand Couronné, either side of Nancy, which pushed back the 2nd Group of Reserve Divisions, comprising the 59th, 68th and 70th Reserve Divisions under General Léon Durand, to the north and the XX Corps of General Balfourier to the south, by the evening of 4 September. In the afternoon of 5 September Castelnau telegraphed to Joffre that he proposed to evacuate Nancy, to preserve the fighting power of the army. Next day Joffre replied that the Second Army was to hold the area east of Nancy if at all possible and only then retire to a line from the Forest of Haye to Saffais, Belchamp and Borville.

The civilian authorities in the city had begun preparations for an evacuation but the troops on the Grand Couronné repulsed German attacks on the right flank, during 5 September. The Reserve divisions were only pushed back a short distance on the front to the east and north of Nancy. An attempt by Moltke to withdraw troops from the 6th Army, to join a new 7th Army being formed for operations on the Oise failed when Rupprecht and Dellmensingen were backed by the Emperor who was at the 6th Army headquarters. German attacks continued on 6 September and XX Corps conducted a counter-attack which gave the defenders a short period to recuperate but the troops of the 2nd Group of Reserve Divisions, east and north of Nancy, began to give way.

On 7 September German attacks further north drove a salient into the French defences south of Verdun at St Mihiel, which could force apart the Second and Third armies. At Nancy, part of the 59th Reserve Division retreated from the height of St Geneviève, which overlooked the Grand Couronné north-west of Nancy, exposing the left flank of the Second Army and Nancy to envelopment. Castelnau ordered a withdrawal from Nancy but the move was circumvented by his staff; Castelnau was ordered by Joffre to maintain the defence of the Grand Couronné for another  The Germans had retired during the afternoon and the French reoccupied the height. German attacks continued until the morning of 8 September but then diminished as Moltke began to withdraw troops to the right flank of the German armies. Moltke sent Major Roeder to the 6th Army with orders to end the offensive and prepare to retire to the frontier; only now did Rupprecht find out that the armies near Paris were under severe pressure. The attacks by the 6th Army diminished and on 10 September it began to withdraw towards the frontier. On 13 September, Pont-à-Mousson and Lunéville were re-occupied by the French unopposed who then closed up to the Seille river, where the front stabilised until 1918.

First Battle of the Marne, 5–12 September

Joffre used the railways which had transported French troops to the German frontier to move troops back from Lorraine and Alsace to form a new Sixth Army under General Michel-Joseph Maunoury with nine divisions and two cavalry divisions. By 10 September twenty divisions and three cavalry divisions had been moved west from the German border to the French centre and left and the balance of force between the German  and the Third, Fourth, Ninth, Fifth armies, the BEF and Sixth Army had changed to  Late on 4 September Joffre ordered the Sixth Army to attack eastwards over the Ourcq towards Château Thierry as the BEF advanced towards Montmirail and the Fifth Army attacked northwards, with its right flank protected by the Ninth Army along the St Gond marshes. The French First–Fourth armies to the east were to resist the attacks of the German  between Verdun and Toul and repulse an enveloping attack on the defences south of Nancy from the north. The 6th and 7th armies were reinforced by heavy artillery from Metz and attacked again on 4 September along the Moselle.

On 5 September the Sixth Army advanced eastwards from Paris and met the German IV Reserve Corps, which had moved into the area that morning and stopped the French short of high ground north of Meaux. General Alexander von Kluck the 1st Army commander, ordered the II Corps to move back to the north bank of the Marne, which began a redeployment of all four 1st Army corps to the north bank by 8 September. The swift move to the north bank prevented the Sixth Army from crossing the Ourcq but created a gap between the 1st and 2nd Armies. The Fifth Army also advanced into the gap and by 8 September crossed the Petit Morin, which forced Bülow to withdraw the right flank of the 2nd Army. Next day the Fifth Army re-crossed the Marne and the German 1st and 2nd armies began to retire as the French Ninth, Fourth and Third armies fought defensive battles with the 3rd Army which was forced to retreat with the 1st and 2nd armies on 9 September.

Further east the Third Army was forced back to the west of Verdun as German attacks were made on the Meuse Heights to the south-east but managed to maintain contact with Verdun and the Fourth Army to the west. German attacks against the Second Army south of Verdun from 5 September almost forced the French to retreat but on 8 September the crisis eased. By 10 September the German armies west of Verdun were retreating towards the Aisne and the Franco-British were following up, collecting stragglers and equipment. On 12 September Joffre ordered an outflanking move to the west and an attack northwards by the Third Army to cut off the German retreat. The pursuit was too slow and on 14 September, the German armies dug in north of the Aisne and the Allies met trench lines rather than rearguards.

Notes

Footnotes

References 

Books
 
 
 
 
 
 
 
 
 
 
 
 

Journals

Further reading

Books
 
 
 

Reports
 

Websites

External links

 Battle of the Frontiers animation
 Frontiers 1914
 Battle of the Frontiers of France, 20–24 August 1914

Battles of the Western Front (World War I)
Battles of World War I involving France
Battles of World War I involving Germany
Battles of World War I involving the United Kingdom
Battles of World War I involving Belgium
1914 in France
1914 in Belgium
Conflicts in 1914
August 1914 events
September 1914 events